Mark Timothy Jon Enzer, OBE, is a British engineer. He is the CTO of consultancy Mott MacDonald and former head of the National Digital Twin Programme at the Centre for Digital Built Britain.

Education
In 1987, Enzer graduated from Oxford University (Engineering Science) and in 1992 from Leeds University (Tropical Public Health Engineering). In 2004 he received MBA degree from University of Cambridge.

Career 
From November 2009 to March 2012, Enzer was engineering manager at Anglian Water's @one Alliance.

Mott MacDonald 
From April 2012 to July 2013, he was Engineering Director of Mott MacDonald's Water Division. He then served as global water sector leader until December 2016, and was appointed as chief technical officer in January 2017.

Centre for Digital Built Britain 
From April 2020 until April 2022, Enzer was head of the National Digital Twin Programme and chair of CDBB's Digital Framework Task Group.

Honours
In the 2020 Birthday Honours, Enzer was awarded OBE for his services to national infrastructure.

References

External links 
 Mark Enzer on Twitter

Chief technology officers
Alumni of the University of Oxford
Alumni of the University of Leeds
Alumni of the University of Cambridge
Officers of the Order of the British Empire
Year of birth missing (living people)
Living people